Russian Rhapsody is a 1944 Warner Bros. Merrie Melodies cartoon directed by Bob Clampett. The short was released on May 20, 1944.

Plot
Nazi German bombers are failing to make it to Moscow in World War II; infuriated by his soldiers' constant failure, Fuhrer Adolf Hitler announces his decision via a radio broadcast at a "New Odor" rally that he will personally fly a heavy bomber to attack the Russians. On the way to Moscow, Russian gremlins sneak onto the plane in flight and without Hitler's being aware of what's going on, begin to dismantle it while singing "We Are Gremlins from the Kremlin" to the tunes of “Ochi Chyornye” (“Dark Eyes”) and “Eh, ukhnem” (“Song of the Volga Boatmen”), and the sabotage includes a "termiteski" busily devouring the plane's wing (with loud burps) and a microscopic gremlin smashing the control panel dials with an enormous wooden mallet and announcing "I'm only three and a half years old!"

Hitler eventually discovers the gremlins after he's been stabbed in the buttocks and tries to retaliate. He fails, being severely frightened by several gremlins holding a mask of Joseph Stalin. The gremlins succeed in ejecting him from the bomber by cutting a hole in the fuselage beneath him. As he falls, Hitler comes to and realizes the plane is right behind him in a power dive. He tries to outrun the plane and to hide behind a small sapling upon landing, but the plane alters course as seen by its shadow. Both Hitler and the plane are driven into the ground. The plane's tail with its swastika insignia erupts from the ground as a headstone.

The cartoon ends with the gremlins celebrating in victory as Hitler pops out of the ground, with his face grimacing into the one of comedian Lew Lehr, and paraphrasing his famous catchphrase: "Monkeys is the cwaziest [craziest] peoples!" (only changing the word "monkeys" into "Nutzies," referring to Nazis). A gremlin pounds Hitler back into the ground with a sledgehammer, ending the film under Clampett's signature ‘‘bee-woop’’ vocalization.

Voice actors 
Mel Blanc voiced the parts of the gremlins and Adolf Hitler. Robert C. Bruce is heard as the radio announcer. The Sherry Allen Group sang "We Are Gremlins from the Kremlin".

Production 
Many of the gremlins are caricatures of the Warner Bros. animation department staff. The style is reminiscent of a 1936 Christmas card showcasing the staff as drawn by T. Hee. Among the recognizable gremlins are Leon Schlesinger (who is shown tapping the heads off of rivets with a hammer as he's being raised by a rope), Bob Clampett, Friz Freleng, Michael Maltese, Bob Bentley, Rod Scribner, Melvin Millar, Mike Sasanoff, Johnny Burton, Lou Cavette, Henry Binder and Ray Katz. Freleng and Binder are also referenced during Hitler's fake German rant at the beginning of the cartoon. What's Cookin' Doc? (also directed by Bob Clampett) is referenced as well.
The lyrics reference the 1942 Disney cartoon and the 1942 song (composed by Oliver Wallace and recorded by Spike Jones) both titled Der Fuhrer's Face.
The gag showing a gremlin swapping windshield stickers is a reference to wartime U.S. gasoline rationing.
Initially, this short was going to be titled "Gremlins from the Kremlin", but Walt Disney was already in production of an adaptation of Roald Dahl's The Gremlins, which ended up never getting made.

Reception
Animator Mark Kausler writes, "Russian Rhapsody is a funny musical cartoon about a man who was certainly the antithesis of comedy. The breadth and depth of Hitler's hatred of Jews and crimes against humanity were not fully known in 1944, when this cartoon was released. Director Bob Clampett, as usual, cast his animators well, giving Bob McKimson a showcase for his exceptional performing and drawing ability in the extended animated close-up of Hitler addressing the Nazi party faithful. McKimson makes Hitler a monster with huge shoulders and huge hands that reach out toward the camera in sweeping gestures. The range of emotions that Hitler goes through in his speech—from slobbering hatred as he rolls his r's, to teary resignation as he recalls the "Irish" General Tim O'Schenko (Russian Marshal Timoshenko), to his "Who else?" quip at the end, an impression of Yiddish comedian Artie Auerbach—are not just funny but also among the sharpest political observations created in the golden age of animation."

Home media
VHS, Laserdisc - Cartoon Moviestars: Bugs and Daffy: The Wartime Cartoons
Laserdisc - The Golden Age of Looney Tunes, Vol. 3, Side 6: Tashlin/Clampett
Laserdisc Canada Copy (1995 Dubbed Version) on Bugs Bunny and Friends 
DVD - Looney Tunes Golden Collection: Volume 6, Disc 2
DVD - TCM Spotlight: Errol Flynn Adventures: Uncertain Glory (included as a bonus)
Blu-Ray, DVD - Looney Tunes Platinum Collection: Volume 2, Disc 2

See also
 List of World War II short films

References

External links
 
 
 Russian Rhapsody on the Internet Archive

1944 films
1944 animated films
1944 short films
1940s Warner Bros. animated short films
Cultural depictions of Adolf Hitler
Cultural depictions of Joseph Stalin
American World War II propaganda shorts
American aviation films
Merrie Melodies short films
Films directed by Bob Clampett
American pro-Soviet propaganda films
Animation based on real people
Films scored by Carl Stalling
Films produced by Leon Schlesinger
Films about gremlins